BOAC Flight 712 (callsign Speedbird 712) was a British Overseas Airways Corporation (BOAC) service operated by a Boeing 707-465 from London Heathrow Airport bound for Sydney via Zurich and Singapore. On Monday 8 April 1968, it suffered an engine failure on takeoff that quickly led to a major fire; the engine detached from the aircraft in flight. After the aircraft had made a successful emergency landing, confusion over checklists and distractions from the presence of a check pilot contributed to the deaths of five of the 127 on board. The direct cause of the fire was the failure of a compressor wheel, due to metal fatigue. 

Flight attendant Barbara Jane Harrison was posthumously awarded the George Cross for heroism during the accident, another crew member received a British Empire Medal, and an air traffic controller was made a Member of the Most Excellent Order of the British Empire. As a result of the accident, BOAC changed certain aspects of its emergency procedure checklists.

Flight
Flight 712, scheduled to depart from Heathrow's Terminal 3 at 16:15 BST (15:15 GMT), took off from Runway 28L at 16:27 BST (15:27 GMT). It had 127 people aboard, including a crew augmented by the addition of an acting flight officer, John Hutchinson (later to become a Concorde captain), and a check captain for routine performance review of the pilot in command, Captain Cliff Taylor. As well as the passengers, the aircraft was carrying baggage, mail and a radioactive isotope from the Isotope Production Unit at Harwell destined for the University Hospital in Jerusalem.

Seconds after takeoff from Heathrow's then- runway 28L (extended, years later, and now re-designated as 27L), there was an unexpected bang and the aircraft started vibrating. The throttle controlling number two engine was shutting down. While Captain Taylor ordered an engine failure drill, Flight Engineer Thomas Hicks carried out the engine failure drill, but both he and Check Captain Geoffrey Moss reached for the switch to cancel the undercarriage warning horn. At the same time, First Officer Francis Kirkland inadvertently cancelled the fire bell. Hicks reached for, but did not pull, the engine fire shut-off handle. Moss, observing the fire, exclaimed "Bloody hell! The wing's on fire!" A Mayday was broadcast at 16:29.

In the control tower, the takeoff had been observed by John Davis, who saw what he initially thought was the sun reflecting off the aircraft's wing during its initial climb. Davis quickly realised that the aircraft was on fire. Davis instructed Flight 712 to make a left turn, with the intention that the aircraft would land on runway 28L. He hit the "crash button" which alerted the emergency services and declared an aircraft accident. The emergency services were informed of the type of aircraft involved and given a meeting point at which they were to assemble.

By this time, the windows on the port side at the rear of the fuselage were beginning to melt. As the aircraft flew over Thorpe the burning engine broke away from its mounting; no one on the ground was injured. At this time, the undercarriage was lowered and full flap selected. The flaps stopped three degrees short of their full travel. Cabin crew member Jennifer Suares repeated the emergency landing drill for passengers.

The crew realised that the aircraft would not last long enough to enable a landing back on 28L and declared a Mayday. He also instructed two other aircraft to perform a go-around, as runway 05R crossed runway 28R, which they were due to land on and Davis did not know whether Flight 712 would be able to stop before reaching that runway. The crew accepted Davis's offer of runway 05R, even though it was much shorter and not equipped with ILS. Taylor was able to safely land the aircraft on 05R, using wheel brakes and thrust reversing the outboard engines to halt the aircraft. Taylor asked Davis for permission to evacuate, but the cabin crew were already opening the emergency doors. The flight crew started the fire drill, but the port wing exploded before this could be completed. As a result, the fire shut off handles were not pulled, and the booster pumps and electrical supply were left switched on. Due to the short period of time between the Mayday being declared at 16:29 and the aircraft landing at 16:31, there was no time for the emergency services to lay a carpet of foam, which was standard practice at the time.

Evacuation
The cabin crew started the evacuation, even before the aircraft had come to a halt, via both forward galley doors, both rear doors and the starboard overwing exits. Eighteen passengers escaped via the overwing exits before the fire grew too intense to use that route. The forward port galley door escape slide caught fire before it could be used, but one person jumped from there. 84 people escaped via the starboard galley door. Three of the crew escaped by using the emergency cockpit rope. The rear starboard door escape slide had twisted on deployment, so Taylor climbed down to straighten it, leaving stewardess Jane Harrison at the door assisting the passengers. Six passengers escaped via this route before the slide was punctured and deflated. Harrison pushed out passengers too frightened to jump. Eleven people escaped via this route, and five more escaped via the rear port door before the slide was destroyed. Harrison was last seen preparing to jump, but she turned back and disappeared into the passenger cabin, in an attempt to save the remaining four passengers, including a disabled woman and an eight-year-old girl. Harrison was awarded the George Cross posthumously in recognition of her selfless courage. Thirty-five people were injured, and five died.

Fire-fighting
The first two fire engines to arrive were unable to do much, as they stopped too far from the aircraft and their design prevented their moving once they began making foam. Also, buildup of paint on the coupling threads of nearby fire hydrants prevented hoses from being attached. A backup foam water tender drove in closer and discharged its foam effectively, but the fire had already gained hold by then.

Passengers
The aircraft was carrying 116 passengers and eleven crew. Five people died in the accident: stewardess Barbara Jane Harrison and four passengers. All five were determined to have died of "asphyxia due to inhalation of fire fumes".

Survivors included the pop singer Mark Wynter, who was travelling to Australia to be married, and Katriel Katz, Israeli Ambassador to the Soviet Union. Katz, a large man, was the only passenger to escape by jumping through the forward port door; Hutchinson and Unwin tried to direct him to the slide on the starboard side and were almost carried through the port door by Katz, who was seriously injured in the jump.

Aircraft involved
The aircraft involved was a Boeing 707-465 registered G-ARWE with a total of 20,870 flight hours since it first flew on 27 June 1962. On 21 November 1967 it had suffered an engine failure resulting in an aborted takeoff with no injuries. The aircraft was insured for £2,200,000 with Lloyd's of London.

The aircraft's nose section was salvaged for use on a Convair CV-580 for test purposes as part of the Total In Flight Simulator program.
(Accounts that the nose from G-ARWE was used to repair a damaged TWA 707 are incorrect.)

Investigation
Metal fatigue was ultimately blamed for the failure of the number five compressor wheel in the number two Rolls-Royce 508 Conway turbofan engine, initiating a rapid chain of failures. The crew's omitting to shut off the fuel to the engine was blamed for the rapid growth of the fire and the loss of the aircraft. Check Captain Moss had accidentally cancelled the fire warning bell instead of the undercarriage warning bell. Moss had also issued orders to Captain Taylor, in breach of the normal protocol for his duties. However, the report on the accident also stated that Captain Taylor had briefed Moss to act as an extra set of eyes and ears inside and outside the cockpit. Moss's actions therefore could be seen as acting within that remit. Although Moss had alerted the crew to the fire, none of them were aware that the number 2 engine had fallen off until after the evacuation on the ground.

As a result of the investigation, and lessons learned from the chain of events, BOAC combined the "Engine Fire Drill" and "Engine Severe Failure Drill" checklists into one list, called the "Engine Fire or Severe Failure Drill". Modifications were also made to the checklist, including adding to the checklist confirmation that the fire handles had been pulled.

The aircraft's number 2 port engine No.5097, constructed in 1961, had run for 14,917 hours from new, and had been overhauled in spring 1965 because of vibration caused by metal fatigue that had led to the failure of a stage 8 high-pressure compressor blade. In 1967 the engine had been removed from service because of flame tube deterioration, and as part of the repairs, the low-pressure compressor, of which the number 5 wheel was an original component, was overhauled, but the wheel itself was not tested for fatigue. On 22 November 1967 the engine was bench tested and rejected because of excessive vibration of the high-pressure compressor, but was later released as serviceable following further analysis. After 1,415 hours service on another 707 and modification to the turbine seals, on 5 April 1968 No.5097 became number 2 engine of the port wing of the aircraft, scheduled to fly long-haul to Sydney, Australia, three days later.

According to Rolls-Royce's investigation, shortly after takeoff on 8 April 1968 the 5th stage low-pressure compressor wheel failed in fatigue at the run out radius of the wheel web with the rim, causing secondary failures to other parts of the engine. The wheel then burst through its casing and severed the main fuel pipe, igniting the fuel which was being pumped at 50 gallons (approx. 227 litres) per minute. The engine's two extinguishers had been disabled by damage to the engine cowling. The fire's heat caused the engine pylon to give way, allowing the engine to detach. However, the fuel booster pump continued to function, intensifying the fire until it spread to the wing itself, sweeping back from forward of the leading edge towards the tail. The application of reverse thrust on landing, and the westerly crosswind on the runway, blew the flames underneath the wing and set light to the fuselage. The rapidly intensifying fire then spread under the aircraft and ignited the fuel lines and oxygen tanks, which, within seconds of the aircraft coming to a stop, caused a series of explosions that broke through the fuselage and set fire to the cabin.

Awards

Queen Elizabeth II awarded Barbara Jane Harrison a posthumous George Cross (GC), the only GC ever presented to a woman in peacetime. Her medal was accepted on her behalf by her father, Alan. Harrison is the youngest ever female recipient of the George Cross. Neville Davis-Gordon was awarded the British Empire Medal for Gallantry (BEM). John Davis was appointed a Member of the Most Excellent Order of the British Empire (MBE).

The citation for Barbara Jane Harrison's GC reads:-

The citation for Neville Davis-Gordon's BEM reads:-

In addition, Air Traffic Control Officer John Davis, who was responsible for Flight 712 and had first spotted the port engine fire from the ground, was appointed MBE.

Captain Cliff Taylor and Acting First Officer John Hutchinson had managed to safely land their aircraft which, having lost an engine, was on fire carrying about 22,000 gallons of fuel, in the most testing of circumstances and almost certainly saved 121 lives. Taylor was recommended for an award by BOAC, but following the publication of the official inquiry report in August 1969, the decision was taken at ministerial level not to recognise any member of the flight crew. Both Taylor and Hutchinson received, along with First Officer Francis Kirkland and Check Captain Geoffrey Moss, but not Flight Engineer Thomas Hicks, commendations from BOAC, and Captain Taylor was awarded the British Airline Pilots Association Gold Medal.

See also

Other accidents in which aircrew were decorated include:
Pan Am Flight 73, a hijacking in which stewardess Neerja Bhanot was posthumously awarded her country's highest civilian honour.
Alrosa Mirny Air Enterprise Flight 514
Southwest Flight 1380
British Airways Flight 5390
United Airlines Flight 232
US Airways Flight 1549
2003 Baghdad DHL attempted shootdown incident
British Airtours Flight 28M
Qantas Flight 32
Cathay Pacific Flight 780

Notes

References

External links
British Pathé newsreel
http://www.airliners.net
Photo of burnt out aircraft
Photo of burnt out aircraft
Photo of burnt out aircraft
Photo of burnt out aircraft
Photo of burnt out aircraft
Photo of burnt out aircraft
Photo of burnt out aircraft

Aviation accidents and incidents in 1968
1968 in London
Airliner accidents and incidents caused by in-flight fires
Accidents and incidents involving the Boeing 707
Aviation accidents and incidents at Heathrow Airport
Flight 712
April 1968 events in the United Kingdom
1968 disasters in the United Kingdom
Airliner accidents and incidents in the United Kingdom
Airliner accidents and incidents involving uncontained engine failure
Airliner accidents and incidents involving in-flight engine separations